Sydney Sprague (born February 11, 1992) is an American singer-songwriter and multi-instrumentalist from Phoenix, Arizona.

Biography 
In October 2020, Sprague announced that she had signed a recording deal with Rude Records. She released her first single, "i refuse to die", on the same day.

Later that month, she released a second single "steve". This was followed by singles "staircase failure", "quitter", "object permanence", and "the end of the world."

On February 26, 2021, she released her debut album maybe i will see you at the end of the world.

On September 21, 2021, a deluxe version of the album that included 3 additional tracks, including a remix of "steve", an acoustic version of "object permanence", and a demo titled "landmines."

During February and March 2022, Sprague and her band participated in the "Surviving the Truth Tour", supporting Dashboard Confessional and Jimmy Eat World.

Discography

Albums 

 maybe i will see you at the end of the world (deluxe) (2021, Rude Records)
 maybe i will see you at the end of the world (2020, Rude Records)

References 

Musicians from Phoenix, Arizona
Singer-songwriters from Arizona
Living people

1992 births